Leonard John Coffey (8 August 1883 – 20 April 1919) was an  Australian rules footballer who played with South Melbourne in the Victorian Football League (VFL).

Notes

External links 

1883 births
1919 deaths
Australian rules footballers from Melbourne
Sydney Swans players
People from Sandringham, Victoria